Paul J. Hopper is an American linguist, who was born in Great British. In 1973, he proposed the glottalic theory regarding the reconstruction of the Proto-Indo-European consonant inventory, in parallel with the Georgian linguist Tamaz Gamkrelidze and the Russian linguist Vyacheslav Ivanov. He later also became known for his theory of emergent grammar (Hopper 1987), for his contributions to the theory of grammaticalisation and other work dealing with the interface between grammar and usage. He currently works as the Paul Mellon Distinguished Professor of Humanities at the Carnegie Mellon University in Pittsburgh, USA.

Selected publications
(1973) Glottalized and murmured occlusives in Indo-European. Glotta 7: 141–166.
(1987)  Emergent grammar. Berkeley Linguistics Society 13: 139–157. (Online on archive.org - )
(1993) (with Elizabeth Closs Traugott) Grammaticalization. Cambridge: Cambridge University Press.

References

External links
 Paul Hopper's page on Academia.edu

Linguists from the United States
Living people
Year of birth missing (living people)